Walter "Wally" Ziaja (born July 2, 1949) is a retired American soccer defender.  He spent two seasons in the North American Soccer League and was a member of the U.S. soccer team at the 1972 Summer Olympics. He also earned four caps with the U.S. national team in 1973.

Player

National teams
Ziaja was selected to play with the U.S. team at 1972 Summer Olympics in Munich.  The U.S. went 0-2-1 in group play and failed to qualify for the second round. Ziaja played only one match, the 7–0 loss to West Germany.  He earned his first cap on March 20, 1973, in a 4–0 loss to Poland.  His last game was a 2–0 loss to Israel on November 15, 1973.

Professional
In 1973, Ziaja signed with the Atlanta Chiefs of the North American Soccer League (NASL).  At the end of the season, the Chiefs moved to Denver where it became the Denver Dynamos.  Ziaja played the 1974 NASL season with the Dynamo then left the league.

Coach
Ziaja later went on to coach at Arrowhead High School.  In 2002, he became the girls' soccer coach at Whitefish Bay High School.

He is a member of the Wisconsin Soccer Hall of Fame.

References

External links
 
 NASL stats
 Article on Ziaja’s recreational team

1949 births
Footballers from Linz
American soccer players
Austrian emigrants to the United States
United States men's international soccer players
Footballers at the 1972 Summer Olympics
Olympic soccer players of the United States
North American Soccer League (1968–1984) players
Atlanta Chiefs players
Denver Dynamos players
American soccer coaches
Living people
Association football defenders